The lingual nerve carries sensory innervation from the anterior two-thirds of the tongue. It contains fibres from both the mandibular division of the trigeminal nerve (CN V) and from the facial nerve (CN VII). The fibres from the trigeminal nerve are for touch, pain and temperature (general sensation), and the ones from the facial nerve are for taste (special sensation).

Structure
The lingual nerve lies at first beneath the lateral pterygoid muscle, medial to and in front of the inferior alveolar nerve, and is occasionally joined to this nerve by a branch which may cross the internal maxillary artery.

The chorda tympani (a branch of the facial nerve, CN VII) joins it at an acute angle here, carrying taste fibers from the anterior two-thirds of the tongue and parasympathetic fibers to the submandibular ganglion.

The nerve then passes between the medial pterygoid muscle and the ramus of the mandible, and crosses obliquely to the side of the tongue beneath the constrictor pharyngis superior and styloglossus, and then between the hyoglossus and deep part of the submandibular gland; it finally runs from laterally to medially inferiorly crossing the duct of the submandibular gland, and along the tongue to its tip becoming the sublingual nerve, lying immediately beneath the mucous membrane.

A well known rhyme has been used by anatomy students for many years to remember some features of the lingual nerve anatomy mentioned above:
"The Lingual Nerve, Describes a Curve, Across the Hyoglossus...

Function
The lingual nerve supplies general somatic afferent innervation from the mucous membrane of the anterior two-thirds (body) of the tongue, while the posterior one-third (root) is innervated by the glossopharyngeal. 
It also carries nerve fibers that are not part of the trigeminal nerve, including the chorda tympani nerve of the facial nerve, which provides special sensation (taste) to the anterior 2/3 part of the tongue as well as parasympathetic and sympathetic fibers.

The submandibular ganglion is suspended by two nerve filaments from the lingual nerve.

Clinical significance

Lingual nerve injuries
The most common cause of lingual nerve injuries is third molar (wisdom tooth) surgery, less commonly the lingual nerve can be injured by local anaesthetic dental injections (particularly inferior dental block injections) and sublingual or submandibular surgery.

Any injury to sensory nerves can result in pain, altered sensation and/or numbness, but usually a combination of all three symptoms arises. This can have a significant negative effect on the patient's quality of life affecting their daily function and psychological health.

Patients should be routinely warned about lingual nerve injuries prior to wisdom tooth and floor of mouth surgery. The risk associated with wisdom tooth surgery is commonly accepted to be 2% temporary and 0.2% permanent.

Warning patients of nerve injury prior to administration of deep dental injections has a risk of injury in approximately 1:14,000 with 25% of these remaining persistent. Preoperative warning about these injuries is routinely undertaken in the US and Germany. This reflects good practice recommended by the Royal College of Anaesthetists (prior warning of potential nerve injury in relation to spinal and epidural blocks 1 on 24–57,000 risk).

Infiltration dentistry is a technique that may reduce the possibility of lingual nerve injuries by avoiding deep injections.

Avoiding lingual access when undertaking wisdom tooth surgery will also avoid unnecessary lingual nerve injury

See also
 Lingual branches of hypoglossal nerve

Additional images

References

External links
 
 
 
 
 

Mandibular nerve
Gustatory system
Innervation of the tongue